Michel Mazaré (born in Villeneuve-sur-Lot, 14 January 1954), is a French former rugby league footballer who played as halfback and five-eights, and later, coach.

Career
At club level, he played his entire career for Villeneuve-sur-Lot winning a French Championship title in 1980, as well a Lord Derby Cup title in 1979. He also represented France
After his sports career, he trained Villeneuve-sur-Lot in the 1980s, France in 1991 and Paris Saint Germain during its appearance in Super League.

Honours

Team honours
French Rugby League Championship
Winner in 1980 (Villeneuve-sur-Lot).
Runner-up in 1974 and 1981 (Villeneuve-sur-Lot).
Lord Derby Cup
Champion in 1979 (Villeneuve-sur-Lot).
Runner-up in 1972 (Villeneuve-sur-Lot).

References

External links
Michel Mazaré at rugbyleagueproject.org

1954 births
Living people
French rugby league coaches
France national rugby league team players
Sportspeople from Nouvelle-Aquitaine
Villeneuve Leopards players
Rugby league halfbacks
Rugby league five-eighths
French rugby league players